Blackbuck National Park is a national park in India located at Velavadar in the Bhavnagar District of Gujarat state, India.

Established in 1976 in the Bhal region of Saurashtra, the park is located around 42 km from the district headquarters city of Bhavnagar. Hugging the coasts of the Gulf of Khambhat on the south, it is spread over an area of 34.08 km2, which was primarily a "vidi" (grassland) of the maharaja of the princely state of Bhavnagar for hunting the blackbucks with his famous hunting cheetahs. On the northern side, it is surrounded by wastelands and agriculture fields. The national park has been classified as 4B Gujarat-Rajwada biotic province of semi-arid bio-geographical zone.

Flat land, dry grasses and herds of antelope have always attracted visitors to this park which has a grassland ecosystem. Successful conservation programs for the blackbuck, wolf and lesser florican (a bustard) are ongoing. Considered to be an endemic Indian species, the lesser florican, which once lived throughout the country, has become endangered in recent decades. Today, the largest population is in this park. Local wolf numbers are increasing, as are striped hyena, with sightings quite frequent during daylight in winter 2012-2013.

Geography

In July 1976, when the park was established, the initial protected area measured about 18 km2. In 1980, another 16 km2 were added, increasing the total area to 34.08 km2.

A southern portion of the park, which adjoins the Gulf of Khambhat, is in the Gulf's high tide zone and gets inundated with water. However, its semi-arid conditions, together with this inundation of seawater during monsoon, creates habitats suitable for various dependent fauna of the park.

According to a remote sensing study of habitat types, the park area is classified as follows:
 7.57 km2 of dense grassland
 9.91 km2 of sparse grassland
 5.05 km2 of Prosopis shrubland
 5.13 km2 of saline land
 5.08 km2 of high tidal mudflats
The mudflats are the high tide zones of Gulf of Khambhat and the lower part is prone to flooding.

Wildlife Names in Gujarat

There are some names of wildlife of blackbuck National park blackbucks, wolves, Macqueen's bustards, hyenas and lesser floricans, with foxes, jackals and jungle cats as the main carnivores. Other species include wild pigs, hares and rodents typical of the savannah type grasslands and thorn scrubs.

Among birds, sandgrouse and larks are  seen in fair numbers. According to Roger Geoffrey Clarke, the British harrier-expert, the harrier roost found at the park is one of the largest in the world.

Gallery

Tourist information
Though the park is open most of  the year, it remains strictly closed in monsoon from 15 June to 15 October: this is breeding season for blackbuck and very important species like the lesser florican, the smallest bustard. The period from late October to the end of March is recommended for visitors. The best time to visit is from December to March as many species of migratory, including three species of harriers, the lesser florican, eagles and waders, migrate back.

Bhavnagar Airport is connected with Mumbai by daily flights.  The closest international airport is Sardar Vallabhbhai Patel at 153 km by road. The closest railway station is at the town of Dhola, which is about 50 km from the park. The ancient town of Vallabhi is about 30 km away.

See also
 Arid Forest Research Institute
 List of national parks and wildlife sanctuaries of Gujarat, India

References

External links

 Gujarat Tourism: Blackbuck National Park
 More photos of Blackbuck National Park
 

National parks in Gujarat
Protected areas established in 1976
1976 establishments in Gujarat
Tourist attractions in Bhavnagar district